Mylapore, also spelt Mayilapur, is a neighbourhood in the central part of the city of Chennai, India. It is one of the oldest residential parts of the city. It is also called Tirumayilai. The locality is claimed to be the birthplace of the celebrated Tamil philosopher Valluvar, and the Hindu saint and philosopher, Peyalvar.

Mylapore is known for its tree-lined avenues, Kapaleeshwarar Temple, Katcheri seasons, and Ramakrishna Matha among many others. St. Thomas Cathedral Basilica, Chennai which is believed to house the tomb of Thomas the Apostle, is in Mylapore.

Etymology
The word Mylapore is the anglicized form of the Dravidian word Mayilāppūr. It is derived from the Tamil phrase  , which means 'land of the peacock scream'. Historically, peacocks have been known to thrive in the area, which is evident from the several statues in the Kapaleeshwarar Temple towers and in the emblem of the San Thome Basilica. Thirugnanasambandar has also mentioned mayil (peacocks) in his songs in Tevaram. Mylapore is also known as Thirumayilai.

Thiru means 'holy' or 'sacred' and is traditionally used in front of names in all parts of Tamil Nadu like Thiruneermalai (Lord Ranganatha), Thirunageswaram (Lord Vishnu and Lord Shiva), Thirumayam (Lord Vishnu and Lord Shiva), Thirumayilai (Lord Adikeshava Perumal and Lord Kapali Eshwaran), Tiruvanamalai (Lord Shiva), Thiruchendur (Lord Muruga), Tiruchirappalli (Lord Sriranganathar), Thiruttani (Lord Muruga), Tiruchengode (Lord Shiva), Thiruchitrambalam (Lord Shiva and Lord Vishnu), Thirumanancheri (Lord Shiva), Thirunallar (Lord Shani Eshwaran), Thiruporur (Lord Muruga), Thirukkadaiyur (Lord Shiva), Tirukalukundram (Lord Vedagiriswarar temple), Thirukarugavur (Lord Garbharakshambigai temple), Tirunelveli (Lord Nellaiappar), Tiruppur (Holy place where herds belonging to the Pandavas of Mahabharata were returned), Tiruvallur and many more.

History
Mylapore is an ancient settlement. It was historically known as Vedapuri. As the available historical and archaeological evidence show, it could well be the oldest part of Chennai, with written records of early settlements going back to the first century BCE. Thiruvalluvar, the Tamil poet-philosopher, is believed to have been born here in 31 BCE. It was known for its ancient port with a flourishing trade with the Roman Empire, receiving gold in exchange for its products like pepper and fine cloth. St. Thomas the Apostle allegedly died at Mylapore in 72 CE. Ptolemy had recorded in the second century CE that the port of Mylapore was known to the Greeks and the Romans, but does not mention any thing about St. Thomas or Christians. The Saivite Saints of the seventh century, Saint Sambandar and Saint Appar, have sung about the shrine in their hymns. Mention has been made of the early settlement of Santhome (currently known) by Arab travelers and merchants of the ninth and tenth centuries. Marco Polo visited the place in the late 13th century and left a detailed description of the land, the people along with their customs and religion and also visited the tomb of Saint Thomas the Apostle in Mylapore (currently Santhome).

It was considerable maritime time and the ancient German and Greek maps refer to the town as 'Maliarpha'. The later Scottish researchers like James Playfair referred it "Meliapour" Mylapore was occupied by the Portuguese in 1523, who established the viceroyalty of "São Tomé de Meliapor" or "Saint Thomas of Mylapore." Portuguese rule lasted until 1749, except for a brief interregnum between 1662 and 1687, when the town was occupied by the Dutch.

After 1749, the British East India Company took possession of the settlement in the name of Muhammad Ali Khan Wallajah, the Nawab of Arcot. In that same year, Mylapore was incorporated into the administration of the Presidency of Madras. The settlement known as "Luz" developed during this period. The name finds its origins from the 'Nossa Senhora Da Luz' (Our Lady of Light) church built by the Portuguese in 1516 CE. This church is one of the oldest standing Christian structures in all of Tamil Nadu.

In the late 19th and early 20th centuries the town became the commercial and intellectual hub of Madras city and home to British-educated lawyers and statesmen. Some of the luminaries based in Mylapore included Sir V. Bhashyam Aiyangar, Sir S. Subramania Iyer, Sir T. Madhava Rao, Eardley Norton, Sir P. S. Sivaswami Iyer, Pennathur Subramania Iyer, V. Krishnaswamy Iyer, Sir C. P. Ramaswami Iyer, H Bhimasena Rau, C S Rama Rao Sahib, Subanthore Vasudeva Rao, CR Krishnaswamy Rao Sahib,  and the civil engineer C R Narayana Rao.

Location

Mylapore is located a few kilometres to the south of the British-built Chennai city. The neighborhood is bordered by Triplicane in the north, Royapettah in the northwest, Alwarpet in the west, and Mandaveli in the south. The Bay of Bengal coast is in the east of Mylapore. It extends for around 4 km from north to south and 2 km from east to west.

Demographics
The population of Mylapore is estimated to be around 150,000 to 300,000. It has long been a site of cultural importance for Brahmins, which can be attributed to Mylapore's early role as a temple centre. Smartha Brahmins, a sub-sect, were one of the first people to settle in this township. More accurate statistics are not available as Mylapore is not a separate township by itself, but a part of Chennai city. The different neighbourhoods within Mylapore have been distributed among the different wards of the Chennai Corporation.

Notable people
 Peyalvar, one of the twelve alvar saints of South India, in held in popular tradition to have been found in the lily flower in the pond of the Adi Kesava Perumal Temple in Mylapore in 4203 BCE.
 Valluvar, the Tamil poet philosopher and the author of the Tirukkural, was born in Mylapore in 31 BCE.
 According to legends, St. Thomas the Apostle attained martyrdom at Parangimalai in south Chennai in 72 CE. San Thome Basilica is built over his original tomb in Mylapore. His relics were moved to Edessa in the third century.

Important places

Mylapore is known for its cultural and religious heritage. Mylapore is home to hundreds of temples, churches and mosques.

Kapaleeswarar Temple
Kapaleeswarar Temple is one of the most famous temples of Chennai. Originally temple relocated by the Tuluva dynasty (1491–1570 CE) from sea shore of Mylapore. The main deity of the temple is Lord Shiva. The temple exhibits exquisite Dravidian architecture. The huge temple is surrounded by traditional crowded street markets of Chennai selling fruits, flowers, vegetables and traditional brass ware.

Adi Kesava Perumal Temple
Mylapore is known for the Adi Kesava Perumal Temple constructed in honor of Keshava or Vishnu, a principal god in the Hindu pantheon and the "Preserver" in the Hindu trinity. The temple has an idol of Lord Vishnu accompanied by his celestial consort Goddess Lakshmi. This is the birthplace of Peyalvar. It has sannathis for the thayar Mayuravalli, Chakkarathalvar, Sri Andal, Sri Rama & Anjaneya. It is the avatara sthalam (birthplace) of Peyalvar and has a separate sannithi for the Alvar. During the brahmotsavam the utsavar goes in a procession accompanied by Sridevi & Bhudevi in the mada streets and also gives the chance to see the Theppam festival in the centuries-old kulam (tank). Every year the Parthasarathy Perumal comes to the Kesava Perumal temple and Kesava Perumal too goes to Triplicane along with Peyalvar.

Sri Vedantha Desikar Devasthanam/Sri Srinivasar Koil
Mylapore has the Srinivasar temple near Chitra Kulam in Mylapore, which is administered by the Vedantha Desikar Devasthanam (SVDD). It is located beside the Adi Kesava Perumal Temple, which has an imposing gopuram that can be seen from quite a distance.

Valluvar Koil
The Ekambareswarar–Kamakshi Koil, commonly known as the Valluvar Koil, is also located in the neighborhood. The Valluvar shrine is located within the Ekambareswarar temple complex and is dedicated to the poet-saint Valluvar. Dating back to at least the early 16th century, the temple was extensively renovated in the 1970s. Considered to be the birthplace of Valluvar, the temple is the oldest ever built to Valluvar. The temple also serves as the venue for meetings of Tamil language enthusiasts. While many consider the temple as the birthplace of Valluvar, some consider it as his samadhi (place of cremation).

Madhava Perumal Temple
Madhava Perumal Temple is dedicated to Hindu god Vishnu. Constructed in the Dravidian style of architecture, dedicated to Vishnu, who is worshiped as Madhava Perumal and his consort Lakshmi as Amirtagadavalli. According to some, the temple is believed to be the birthplace of Peyalvar, one of the first three of the twelve Alvar saints of the sixth to ninth century CE.

Ramakrishna Math
Sri Ramakrishna Mutt, is the oldest center of the Ramakrishna Order in the South India. Sri Ramakrishna is the main deity of the temple. Architecture of the temple is a blend of Hindu, Islamic, Buddhist, Rajput, and Christian styles. The sprawling campus contains several huge quiet halls for dhyana, the Sanskrit word for meditation. The book store on the campus sells books on Indian epics - Ramayana and Mahabharatha, talks, travels and works of Ramakrishna Paramahamsa and Swami Vivekananda, as well as the philosophy of Vedanta along with monthly magazines. The monks conduct lectures and interviews in English on Sunday evenings from 5:30 PM to 6:30 PM.

San Thome Basilica
San Thome Basilica, built over the tomb of Thomas the Apostle, is a Roman Catholic minor basilica at Santhome in the city of Chennai. Thomas is traditionally believed to have sailed to Muziris in modern-day Kerala India in 52 CE. The Saint Thomas Christians or Nasrani Christians of Kerala are believed to have been converted by St Thomas. Tradition has it that Thomas was killed in 72 CE at Mylapore and his body was interred here. His relics were moved to Edessa in the third century. San Thome Basilica was built over his original tomb in the 16th century by Portuguese explorers, and rebuilt with the status of a cathedral by the British in 1893 which still stands. San Thome Basilica is the principal church of the Madras-Mylapore Roman Catholic Archdiocese. In 1956, Pope Pius XII raised the church to the status of a Minor Basilica, and on 11 February 2006, it was declared a national shrine by the Catholic Bishops' Conference of India. It is an important pilgrimage center for the Syrian Christians of Kerala. The church also has an attached museum.

Luz Church
Church of Our Lady of Light is a Roman Catholic shrine in the locality. It is commonly called as Luz Church by the locals, which derives from the Portuguese name Nossa Senhora da Luz. Built in 1516 by the Portuguese, it is one of the oldest Churches in the city and its foundation stone marks as one of the oldest European monuments in India. The history of the church dates back to the 16th-century legend of safe arrival to land by missionaries. The church is located very near to the Santhome Basilica, where Apostle Thomas is believed to be buried.

Although at the time the church was built, the locality was a thick forest, now it is part of a bustling metropolitan area. This 16th century European architecture building consists of patterns of Gothic arches and Baroque ornamentation. The feast of Our Lady of Light is celebrated on 15 August every year.

Other places
 Saptha Sthaana Shiva Temples, 1. Sri Karaneeswarar Temple; 2. Sri Theerthapaleeswarar Temple; 3. Sri Velleeswarar Temple; 4. Sri Virupaksheeswarar Temple; 5. Sri Valeeswarar Temple; 6. Sri Malleeswarar Temple; 7. Sri Kapaleeswarar Temple.
 Veera Anjaneyar Temple, near Luz
 Madras Music Academy
 Vivekananda College
 Lighthouse, Chennai

Culture

Mylapore is regarded by many as the cultural hub of the city. Mylapore is the home of music sabhas (cultural organizations) and musicians. December is often set aside as the Music Season when regular and continuous kutcheris are organized by the Sabhas in Mylapore. There are performances by Carnatic Music vocalists and artists during this period.  The Parthasarathy Swami Sabha in Mylapore is the oldest Sabha (Assembly) in Tamil Nadu. The Madras Music Academy in the north of the district is an important nucleus of art events in the city. Bharatiya Vidhya Bhavan Auditorium conducts cultural events. The Mylapore Fine Arts located near Nageshwara Rao Park is another Sabha.

The 10-day Panguni Brahmotsavam, a series of procession events of the Kapaleeshwarar temple and related shrines around the temple during the Tamil month of Panguni (March–April), is the most important annual event of the neighbourhood. People from around the country and abroad participate in the events. The main deities of the Kapaleeshwarar temple, including Shiva, Parvathi, and Nandhi taken on a 13-meter-tall chariot, led by Vinayakar chariot and followed by the attendant pantheon of nayanmars (Shaivite saints) in a series of palanquins and other deities of the surrounding shrines including Mundagakanni Amman, Kolavizhi Amman, Vasuki with Valluvar, Draupadi Amman, Ankalaparameshwari Amman, Vairamudi Swami, and Chintadripet Muthukumaran are taken in procession. The Arubathimoovar on day eight draws the maximum crowd during which the 63 nayanmars along with the idol of philosopher-saint Valluvar as the 64th nayanmar are taken in procession. The festival is dated back to 7th century CE.

Nageshwara Rao Garden is known for its play area, shrubs and cultural events.

Mylapore Website provides news about arts and culture of Chennai City.

The Mylapore Times, a weekly neighbourhood newspaper, covers issues relating to the neighbourhood of Mylapore.

Food
Mylapore is also known for its South-Indian food. There are many famous eateries in Mylapore that are thronged by people.

Politics
The Mylapore assembly constituency is part of Chennai South (Lok Sabha constituency).

Education

Colleges
 Ramakrishna Mission Vivekananda College

CBSE affiliated Schools
 P. S. Senior Secondary School
 Vidya Mandir Senior Secondary School
 Sir Sivaswami Kalalaya Senior Secondary School

Tamil Board affiliated Schools
MCTM Chidambaram Chettyar International IB School
Dominic Savio School
Justice Basheer Ahmed Sayeed (J.B.A.S) Memorial Matric Hr. Sec.Boys School
Kesari Higher Secondary School
Lady Sivaswamy Ayyar Girls Higher Secondary School
Montfort Academy
P.S Higher Secondary School
Rosary Matriculation Higher Secondary School
Santhome Higher Secondary School
Sir Sivaswami Kalalaya Higher Secondary School
St Bede's Anglo Indian Higher secondary school
St Raphael's Girls Higher Secondary School
St. John's Schools

Others
 ICAT Design & Media College
 Mindscreen Film Institute

Transportation

Tram
There used to be a tram line running through Kutchery Road from Santhome via Luz, Mylapore.

Road
Mylapore is connected to other parts of the city by MTC buses, with connections including Chennai Central, T. Nagar, Tambaram, Broadway, CMBT, Vadapalani.

Rail
Thirumayilai Railway Station, on the Mass Rapid Transit System network, connects Mylapore to Chennai Beach to the north and Velachery on the south.

See also
 History of Chennai

Notes

References

External links
Festivals of Mylapore

 Mylapore page on Rediff
 Website of Kapaleeswarar Temple
 Official website of Ramakrishna Mutt, Chennai
 Website of Santhome church Mylapore 
 Website of Santhome Cathedral Mylapore

Former Portuguese colonies
Neighbourhoods in Chennai
Cities and towns in Chennai district
Chennai district